"Keep on Walking" is a song by British band Scouting for Girls. It was released on a self-titled EP on 9 March 2009. The EP was released as the band's debut in Australia, while the single charted at number 198 on the UK Singles Chart.

It was the seventh single to be released from their album in the UK.

Information
The song was released in early 2009. It was featured on BBC Radio 1's C-List.

Track listing
1. Keep On Walking
2. Can't Help Falling in Love (live)
3. Elvis Ain't Dead (live)
4. Keep On Walking (live)

Music video
The music video consists of various clips of the band on tour and in various places including a casino. It shows them playing the song on a stage at a concert or festival. It was released to their official YouTube on 9 February 2009.

Charts

Notess

External links
Scouting for Girls Official Website

2009 singles
Scouting for Girls songs
2009 songs
Epic Records singles
Songs written by Roy Stride